The Edgar Morin Centre (French: Centre Edgar Morin, previously CETSAH, Centre d’Études Transdisciplinaires, Sociologie, Anthropologie, Histoire) is a graduate teaching and research unit of the École des Hautes Études en Sciences Sociales and of the French Centre National de la Recherche Scientifique, Paris. Currently enjoying its fifth decade of activity, the Center (named after the internationally renowned social theorist Edgar Morin) is part of the Interdisciplinary Institute for the Anthropology of Contemporary Societies (IIAC).

History 

The Edgar Morin Center was established in 1960 at the École Pratique des Hautes Études by French sociologist Georges Friedmann. Initially named Center for the Study of Mass Communications, it evolved into the CETSAH in 1973. Only in 2007 it was given its current name, as a tribute to Edgar Morin. Under the prestigious guidance and influence of Morin and of the late Roland Barthes, over the years the Centre has been producing research in such fields as sociology, cultural anthropology, semiotics, media studies, complexity studies, philosophy, history, political science and social psychology.

Research activities 

Transdisciplinarity is the main feature of research at the Edgar Morin Centre. Typical research topics offer multiple potential entries. Food, for instance, is a basic function both in physiological and social terms. As another example, the body can and should be considered as a historical, medical, psychosocial, political, and social construct. All the teams apply this perspective to their specific topics. The Centre currently hosts about 80 researchers, doctoral and masters students.

Research teams are organised as follows:

Teaching activities 

The Centre is hosted by the EHESS, whose advanced programs are intended to lead to research careers. Masters and doctoral students are admitted by application. The main topics include: history, social psychology, sociology, ethnography, media studies, field methodologies, epistemology, environmental sciences.

Publishing 

Since 1961, the Centre has been publishing the transdisciplinary journal Communications, which has regularly produced thematic issues featuring articles by prominent international intellectuals, social theorists and scientists. Among others: Roland Barthes, Umberto Eco, Moses Finley, Noam Chomsky, Tzvetan Todorov, Bill Viola, Paul Virilio, Raymond Boudon, Jacques Le Goff..

References 
 Edgar Morin Center (in French)

Educational institutions established in 1960
Social science institutes
Research institutes in France
1960 establishments in France
French National Centre for Scientific Research